Wave is the fifth studio album by Brazilian jazz musician Antônio Carlos Jobim, released in 1967 on A&M Records. Recorded in the US with mostly American musicians, it peaked at number 114 on the Billboard 200 chart, as well as number 5 on the Jazz Albums chart.

Wave includes an ensemble of elite jazz musicians, including trombonists Urbie Green and Jimmy Cleveland, flautist Jerome Richardson, and bassist Ron Carter. Prolific jazz album cover photographer Pete Turner created the psychedelic solarized cover picture of a giraffe.

Reception

In a 2014 review, Richard S. Ginell of AllMusic praised the album for "Wave" and "Triste" (deeming them two "instant standards") and its "absolutely first-rate tunes... that escaped overexposure and thus sound fresh today." He concluded, "one only wishes that this album were longer; 31:45 is not enough." Chris May, in a review on All About Jazz, said Claus Ogerman's simple string arrangements added to the "modern appeal" through "vivid evocation of a long-gone time and place." He added, "as jazz, Wave has no more authenticity than its cover shot suggesting an African giraffe traversing a Brazilian beach, but it remains an elegant and delightful album." A review on Tiny Mix Tapes said, "with Wave....you'll find repeated listening will become a must."

In 2007, Rolling Stone Brasil magazine ranked Wave number 92 in "Os 100 Maiores Discos da Música Brasileira" (The 100 greatest Brazilian music records). Guitar Player magazine included it on their list of The 40 Greatest Guitar Albums Of 1967.

Track listing

Personnel
Credits adapted from liner notes.
 Antônio Carlos Jobim – piano, guitar, harpsichord, vocals
 Urbie Green – trombone
 Jimmy Cleveland – trombone
 Raymond Beckenstein – flute, piccolo
 Romeo Penque – flute, piccolo
 Jerome Richardson – flute, piccolo
 Joseph Singer – French horn
 Ron Carter – double bass
 Dom Um Romão – drums
 Bobby Rosengarden – drums
 Claudio Slon – drums

Strings
 Claus Ogerman – arranger, conductor
 Bernard Eichen – violin
 Lewis Eley – violin
 Paul Gershman – violin
 Emanuel Green – violin
 Louis Haber – violin
 Julius Held – violin
 Leo Kruczek – violin
 Harry Lookofsky – violin
 Joseph Malignaggi – violin
 Gene Orloff – violin
 Raoul Poliakin – violin
 Irving Spice – violin
 Louis Stone – violin
 Abe Kessler – cello
 Charles McCracken – cello
 George Ricci – cello
 Harvey Shapiro – cello

Production
 Sam Antupit – album design
 Pete Turner – photography

Charts

References

External links
 

1967 albums
Antônio Carlos Jobim albums
Albums produced by Creed Taylor
Albums arranged by Claus Ogerman
Albums conducted by Claus Ogerman
A&M Records albums
Albums recorded at Van Gelder Studio